Olympic Coast may refer to:

 Olympiaki Akti in Greece
 Olympic Coast National Marine Sanctuary, Olympic Peninsula, Washington State, USA
 the coast of the U.S. Washington State Olympic Peninsula
 the coast formerly ruled by Olympia, Greece

See also

 
 Olympic (disambiguation)
 Coast (disambiguation)